A list of the tallest structures with clocks on their exterior that can be seen from the ground. The list includes various structures with a working clock face or faces on their exteriors. The first type of structure are proper Clock towers which are structures that fulfil the definition of a tower with a clock face or faces on the exterior wall or walls. Possibly the most famous example is the colloquially termed Big Ben. Some structures of this type were originally built as bell towers and had the clocks added later, such as the Springfield Campanille. Some clock towers of this type are freestanding, such as the Joseph Chamberlain Memorial Clock Tower, while others are attached to, or on top of, buildings such as the tower on the Philadelphia City Hall. The second set of structures are buildings (rather than towers) that had clock faces on the exterior as part of their original design such as the Wrigley Building. The third set of structures are buildings that have had a clock face or faces added after the original building was constructed such as the Palace of Culture and Science. This division of structures with clock faces follows the general terminology used in related articles and follows Council on Tall Buildings and Urban Habitat (CTBUH) criteria. For the purposes of comparison and clarity this list includes all structures with clocks and clock faces of the types previously described. The list includes all clock 'tower' structures with a height of at least .

List

See also
List of largest clock faces
List of clock towers
List of tallest towers
List of tallest buildings

References

Clock towers